Harry Roberts Carson (December 8, 1869 - July 13, 1948) was an American Episcopal cleric who served as bishop of the Episcopal Diocese of Haiti from 1923 to 1943.

Biography
Carson was born on December 8, 1869, in Norristown, Pennsylvania, the son of Henry Samuel Carson and Mary Thomas. He studied at Sewanee: The University of the South between 1893 and 1895. After graduation he was ordained deacon on January 1, 1895, and priest on January 10, 1896, by the Bishop of Louisiana Davis Sessums in Christ Church Cathedral (New Orleans). He then served as a general missionary in the Diocese of Louisiana till 1898, after which he became a navy chaplain in the Spanish–American War. He then served as rector of St Mary's Church in Franklin, Louisiana between 1899 and 1904. In 1904 he became rector of Grace Church in Monroe, Louisiana, while in 1910 he was appointed Archdeacon of Northern Louisiana, a post he retained till 1912. Afterwards he became chaplain at Ancon Hospital in the Panama Canal Zone and Archdeacon of Panama between 1913 and 1922.

He was elected Missionary Bishop of Haiti in 1922 and was consecrated to the episcopate on January 10, 1923, by Presiding Bishop Daniel S. Tuttle. As from January 1, 1928, he was also Bishop in charge of the  Dominican Republic. He retired in 1943 and died on July 13, 1948, in Port-au-Prince, Haiti.

References 

1869 births
1948 deaths
American Episcopalians
American expatriate bishops
American expatriates in Haiti
Episcopal bishops of Haiti